Jadranko "Dado" Džihan (born 24 May 1964), also credited as Dado Jehan, Waves and Patterns, is a composer, music producer and sound master from Bosnia and Herzegovina. A member of New Primitives, Top lista nadrealista an art movement of Sarajevo of the early 1980s. From 1991, based in London. Works as a composer. He is also the brother of Vlado Džihan, best known as one half of the Viennese downtempo electronica duo DZihan & Kamien. 

1980-1984 in Sarajevo Dado and his friend Darko Ostojić "Ogi" aka Oggie the Kid, formed a rock band with a spiritual touch called Nirvana, later changed to Cyclone. Džihan played keyboards in one of the most successful bands in ex-Yugoslavia, Zabranjeno Pušenje – “No Smoking Orchestra” releasing a number of critically acclaimed albums. He was the lead vocalist in the band Kongres, and played keyboards in Valentino (band), Gino Banana, Hari Mata Hari and many others including the forward-thinking band "BITLISI" co-founded with another dear friend and a colleague from Top lista nadrealista Zlaja Ivanisevic.

1991, in the eve of the Bosnian War, Džihan moved to London, and continued to work in Music industry, Film and TV as a composer, music producer, pianist, sound artist and actor. His eclectic compositional style blends ethnic elements with classical, contemporary and experimental works.

Dado’s passion is music. A prolific composer. His particular area of expertise is creating cutting edge, bold and gripping music. A highly versatile multi-instrumentalist, his style is warm, melodic and distinctive. Dado is equally at ease with writing contemporary, hip scores as he is writing a symphonic piece. His eclectic compositional style seamlessly blends European modern and classical works with ethnic elements from the Balkans, Middle East and Africa.
A classically trained pianist, he is also a sound designer and performer with more than 30 years of experience. He loves sound design, sound sculpting, soundscape, and experimental foley!

Some of his film credits include Angelina Jolie’s directorial debut In the Land of Blood and Honey (2011), Anthony Minghella’s Breaking and Entering, Well Tempered Corpses / Dobro Ustimani Mrtvaci by Benjamin Filipovic, “Sitting Ducks” by Gerald Fox and many more.

References

External links
 
 

1964 births
Living people
Bosnia and Herzegovina composers
Bosnia and Herzegovina expatriates in England
Bosnia and Herzegovina film score composers
Bosnia and Herzegovina male television actors
Bosnia and Herzegovina male film actors
Bosnia and Herzegovina pianists
Bosnia and Herzegovina rock musicians
Bosnia and Herzegovina songwriters
Musicians from Sarajevo
Rock keyboardists
University of Sarajevo alumni
Zabranjeno pušenje members
20th-century Bosnia and Herzegovina male actors
21st-century pianists
New Primitivism people
Top lista nadrealista